Martina Vozza (born 3 April 2004) is an Italian visually impaired para alpine skier.

Career
Vozza made her debut at the 2021 World Para Snow Sports Championships held in Lillehammer, Norway where she won the bronze medal in the slalom event. She qualified to compete at the 2022 Winter Paralympics held in Beijing, China.

References 

2004 births
Living people
Italian female alpine skiers
Alpine skiers at the 2022 Winter Paralympics
Visually impaired category Paralympic competitors
Italian blind people
21st-century Italian women